"Do Yo Thang" is a song by Christian hip hop musician KJ-52, from his 2007 album The Yearbook. In 2009, it won the GMA Dove Award for Rap/Hip Hop Recorded Song of the Year at the 40th GMA Dove Awards.

The song has been described as a "party" tune with a "beat-driven" sound. A remix featuring B. Reith is on KJ-52's The Missing Pages.

References

2008 singles
KJ-52 songs
2008 songs